Fibriciellum is a fungal genus in the family Hydnodontaceae. The genus is monotypic, and contains one corticioid species, Fibriciellum silvae-ryae, found in Europe. The genus and species were described in 1975.

References

Trechisporales
Fungi of Europe
Monotypic Basidiomycota genera
Trechisporales genera